Pachistopelma is a genus of Brazilian tarantulas that was first described by Reginald Innes Pocock in 1901.  it contains two species, found in Brazil: P. bromelicola and P. rufonigrum. They have a straight front eye row and males have a spinose spur on the first tibia. Females have two spermathecae lacking lobes or constrictions that have a slight curvature in the middle.

See also
 List of Theraphosidae species

References

Theraphosidae genera
Spiders of Brazil
Taxa named by R. I. Pocock
Theraphosidae